The Pinoy Pop Superstar Year 2 Grand Contenders' album is a compilation album released in 2006 featuring pop songs sung by the finalists of the second series of the Philippine TV Show Pinoy Pop Superstar.

Track listing 

To Where You Are (Linda Thompson Jennes, Richard Marx) - Harry Santos
Kahit Isang Saglit (Alan Ayque, Louie Ocampo) - Gerald Santos (4:33) 
All The Man That I Need (Michael Gore, Dean Pitchford) - Aicelle Santos (3:17) 
If I Could (Ron Miller, Ken Hirsch, Marti Sharron) - Irra Cenina (3:34)
How Can You Mend a Broken Heart? (Barry Gibb, Robin Gibb) - Denver Regencia (5:01) 
(You Make Me Feel Like) A Natural Woman (Gerald Goffin, Carole King Larkey, Jerry Wexler) - Elise Estrada (2:43)  
Neither One Of Us (Rosemarie Tan) - Rosemarie Tan (4:17)
Magsimula Ka (Gines Tan) - (4:57)
To Where You Are (Minus One) - (4:02)
Kahit Isang Saglit (Minus One) - (4:34)
All The Man That I Need (Minus One) - (3:17)
If I Could (Minus One) - (3:34)
How Can You Mend A Broken Heart (Minus One) - (5:06)
You Make Me Feel Like A Natural Woman (Minus One) - (2:44)
Neither One Of Us (Minus One) - (4:15)
Magsimula Ka (Minus One) - (4:53)

2005 compilation albums
Pinoy Pop Superstar albums
GMA Music albums